The 5th District of the Iowa House of Representatives in the state of Iowa.

Current elected officials
Thomas Jeneary is the representative currently representing the district.

Past representatives
The district has previously been represented by:
 Rollin Edelen, 1971–1973
 Lester Menke, 1973–1983
 Donald Paulin, 1983–1989
 Bradly Banks, 1989–1993
 Lee J. Plasier, 1993–1995
 Kenneth Veenstra, 1995–1999
 Dwayne Alons, 1999–2003
 Royd Chambers, 2003–2013
 Chuck Soderberg, 2013–2015
 Chuck Holz, 2015–2018
 Thomas Jeneary, 2019–present

References

005